Political killing may refer to:
 Extrajudicial killing, the result of a political decision
 Politicide, killing based on the victim's political ideology